The 1929 Oklahoma Sooners football team represented the University of Oklahoma in the 1929 college football season. In their third year under head coach Adrian Lindsey, the Sooners compiled a 3–3–2 record (2–2–1 against conference opponents), finished in fourth place in the Big Six Conference, and matched their opponents in scoring with a combined total of 81 to 81.

No Sooners received All-America honors in 1929, though back Frank Crider received all-conference honors.

Schedule

References

Oklahoma
Oklahoma Sooners football seasons
Oklahoma Sooners football